Brian Michael Lawrence (born May 14, 1976) is an American former professional baseball starting pitcher. He played in Major League Baseball (MLB) for the San Diego Padres and New York Mets. He is currently the pitching coach of the South Bend Cubs, a Class A affiliate of the Chicago Cubs.

High school
Lawrence attended Carthage High School in Carthage, Texas.  His senior year (1994) under head coach Scott Lee, he led the Bulldogs to the final four State Semi-Final game in Austin versus the Belton Tigers of Bell County, losing the game 9–5 on a walk-off grand-slam given up by his relief pitcher.

College
Lawrence attended Northwestern State University in Natchitoches, Louisiana.

Professional career

San Diego Padres
In the 1998 Major League Baseball draft, the San Diego Padres selected Lawrence in the 17th round. After spending the rest of that year at the Rookie League and Class A Short Season levels of the Padres' organization, he played a full season in 1999 with the Class A-Advanced Rancho Cucamonga Quakes, finishing with a 12–8 record and a 3.39 earned run average (ERA). During the 2000 season, Lawrence split time between the Double-A Mobile BayBears and the Triple-A Las Vegas Stars.

At the  end of the 2001 season, Lawrence made his major-league debut for the Padres. He ended up going 5–5 with a 3.45 ERA in 27 games (15 starts). The 2001 season was the only one in which the Padres used him extensively in a relief role. By 2002, he had established himself in the Padres' starting rotation, and he made at least 31 starts with the Padres in each of the next four seasons. On June 12, 2002, Lawrence struck out all three batters on nine total pitches in the third inning of a 2–0 win over the Baltimore Orioles;  he became the 24th National League pitcher and the 33rd pitcher in major-league history to accomplish an immaculate inning. For three consecutive years, 2002–2004, he logged more than 200 innings pitched, and he won at least 10 games in each of those seasons. However, in 2005, his record was just 7–15, and his ERA was 4.83—his highest ERA in the majors.  He threw the slowest fastball of all NL starters in 2005, averaging .

Washington Nationals
After the 2005 season, the Padres traded Lawrence to the Washington Nationals for third baseman Vinny Castilla. Following the trade to the Nationals, Padres General Manager Kevin Towers was quoted as saying "Brian Lawrence was an effective low cost innings-eater". The righty would never have an opportunity to pitch for the Nationals. On the second day of spring training for the  season, team doctors discovered a torn labrum and a torn rotator cuff in his right shoulder, which put him on the disabled list for all of 2006. After the 2006 season, the Nationals declined their  option on Lawrence.

Colorado Rockies
On January 21, 2007, Lawrence was signed by the Colorado Rockies, but was released early in the season.

New York Mets
On May 6, 2007, Lawrence signed a minor league contract with the New York Mets. The Mets assigned him to their Triple-A affiliate, the New Orleans Zephyrs. On August 2, 2007, Lawrence was called up to the major leagues, and started his first game with the Mets against the Milwaukee Brewers.  His victory in Milwaukee was his first major league win in almost 2 years. He was designated for assignment on September 18, 2007. Lawrence made six starts for the Mets and posted a 6.83 ERA. Lawrence opted for free agency after the season.

Kansas City Royals
On January 19, 2008, the Kansas City Royals signed Lawrence to a minor league contract with an invitation to spring training, he was released from the team on March 27, 2008.

Camden Riversharks
On April 24, 2008, Lawrence signed with the Camden Riversharks of the Atlantic League.

Atlanta Braves
On June 8, the Atlanta Braves bought Lawrence's contract from Camden and assigned him to Triple-A Richmond. He became a free agent at the end of the season.

Orange County Flyers
In his Flyers debut, he threw a complete game one-hitter (doubleheader games in the minors are 7 innings).

Return to the Padres
The San Diego Padres purchased his contract from the Flyers on June 15, 2009 and sent him to Triple-A.

On August 1, 2009 the San Diego Padres released Lawrence.

Florida Marlins
On August 18, 2009, Lawrence signed a minor league contract with the Florida Marlins. His contract expired at the end of the season. Lawrence re-signed a minor league contract with the Marlins on April 1, 2010.

San Francisco Giants
Lawrence signed with the San Francisco Giants on February 14, 2011, but he was released before the 2011 season on April 1.

Los Angeles Angels of Anaheim
He signed with the Los Angeles Angels of Anaheim on April 17. However, he retired on June 2 after going 2–5 with an 8.07 ERA for the Triple-A Salt Lake Bees of the Pacific Coast League.

Coaching career
In 2012, he was named the pitching coach for the Normal CornBelters of the Frontier League, an independent professional baseball league.

He was named Pitching Coach for the Lake Elsinore Storm of the California League.

He was released from his minor league contract on December 7, 2012 in order to become a pitching coach.

References

External links

Brian Lawrence: Behind the Dugout

1976 births
Living people
San Diego Padres players
New York Mets players
Atlanta Braves players
Baseball players from Colorado
Major League Baseball pitchers
Sportspeople from Fort Collins, Colorado
Northwestern State Demons baseball players
Clinton LumberKings players
Idaho Falls Braves players
Rancho Cucamonga Quakes players
Las Vegas Stars (baseball) players
Mobile BayBears players
Portland Beavers players
Colorado Springs Sky Sox players
New Orleans Zephyrs players
Camden Riversharks players
Richmond Braves players
Orange County Flyers players
Salt Lake Bees players
Minor league baseball coaches
Panola Ponies baseball players